A cowcatcher, also known as a pilot, is the device mounted at the front of a locomotive to deflect obstacles on the track that might otherwise damage or derail it or the train.

In the UK small metal bars called life-guards, rail guards or guard irons are provided immediately in front of the wheels. They knock away smaller obstacles lying directly on the running surface of the railhead. Historically, fenced-off railway systems in Europe relied exclusively on those devices and cowcatchers were not required, but in modern systems cowcatchers have generally superseded them.

Instead of a cowcatcher, trams use a device called a fender. Objects lying on the tram track come in contact with a sensor bracket, which triggers the lowering of a basket-shaped device to the ground, preventing the overrunning of the obstacles and dragging them along the road surface in front of the wheels.

In snowy areas the cowcatcher also has the function of a snowplough.

Invention
The cowcatcher was invented by Charles Babbage in the 19th century, during his period of working for the Liverpool and Manchester Railway. However, Babbage's invention was not constructed, and it is uncertain whether later manufacturers were aware of Babbage's idea.

Design

On a mainline locomotive, the cowcatcher has to successfully deflect an obstacle hit at speed. The design principle is to push the object upwards and sideways out of the way and not to lift the locomotive on impact.

The typical shape is a blunt wedge with a shallow V-shape in plan. In the later days of steam locomotives, the front coupler was designed to swing out of the way also, so it could not get caught up; this was called a 'drop coupler pilot'.

Early on, cowcatchers were normally fabricated of bars mounted on a frame; later on, sheet metal cowcatchers were often used for their additional smoothness, and some cast steel cowcatchers were employed for their mass and smooth shape. Early diesel locomotives followed the same plan.

Cowcatchers on early shunting locomotives in the US often had steps (called "footboard pilots") to allow yard workers to ride with the locomotive. In some countries, footboard pilots are outlawed for safety reasons, and have been removed. Modern locomotives often have front and rear platforms with safety rails, or deeply recessed steps, where workers can ride.

Modern cowcatchers
Most modern European rail vehicles must have cowcatchers with a snowplough function and rail guards.

Modern US diesel locomotives have flatter, less wedge-shaped cowcatchers, because a diesel locomotive has the cab near the front, and the crew are vulnerable to impact from obstacles pushed up by the cowcatcher.

Anti-climbers

To protect the crew and passengers, most modern locomotives have a horizontally grooved steel beam known as an anti-climber fitted across the front, above the coupler. Its purpose is to prevent colliding locomotives from riding up and moving over the locomotive frame through the cab.

See also 
 Bullbar
 Buffer (rail transport)
 Buffer stop
 Headstock (rolling stock)

References

Further reading

  - describes seven other meanings of the word "pilot" historically used on Britain's railways.
  - describes Lorenzo Davies, alleged inventor of the cowcatcher.

English inventions
Locomotive parts
Railway safety